This is a list of Canada's number-one singles of 2000. RPM was a Canadian magazine that published the best-performing singles of Canada from 1964 to 2000. The final RPM chart was issued on 6 November 2000, when the magazine ceased publication. After 6 November, the number-one singles in Canada were compiled by the American-based music sales tracking company, Nielsen SoundScan. The chart is compiled every Wednesday and is published by Jam! Canoe on Thursdays.

Sixteen songs reached number one in Canada during 2000. Eiffel 65 had the first number-one hit of the year with "Blue (Da Ba Dee)", and O-Town finished the year at number one with "Liquid Dreams". Ten artists topped the Canadian chart for the first time this year: Christina Aguilera, Backstreet Boys, soulDecision, Thrust, NSYNC, Third Eye Blind, The Product G&B, Sonique, and the Moffatts. Backstreet Boys and NSYNC were the two acts that reached number one with more than one single in 2000.

Because RPM ceased publication in November and Billboard did not publish year-end charts for Canada until 2008, no year-end chart for Canada exists for 2000. In terms of weeks spent at number one, Madonna was the most successful act, topping the RPM Singles Chart for nine weeks in September, October, and November with "Music". Backstreet Boys earned the second-highest tally, eight weeks, with "Show Me the Meaning of Being Lonely" and "Shape of My Heart". Britney Spears had a six-week number-one hit with "Oops!... I Did It Again" while NSYNC, Sonique, and Matchbox Twenty spent five issues at number one with their number-one songs. Savage Garden and Third Eye Blind stayed four and three weeks at the summit, respectively. Three Canadian acts peaked at number one in 2000: soulDecision, Thrust, and the Moffats.

RPM Singles Chart: January 2000 – November 2000

Nielsen SoundScan Singles chart: November 2000 – December 2000
The following lists the number one best-selling singles in Canada following the ceasing of RPM magazine. This section published in Billboard Magazine under the Hits of the World section. Only songs released as physical singles qualified for this chart during this time. During this period, the singles market in Canada was very limited in both scope and availability, and in many cases, these songs received little or no radio support. Nevertheless, this was the only singles chart Canadians had until June 2007, when the Canadian Hot 100 was released to the public. Note that Billboard publishes charts with an issue date approximately 7–10 days in advance.

Notes

See also
2000 in music
List of Hot 100 number-one singles of 2000 (U.S.)

References

External links
 Read about RPM Magazine at the AV Trust
 Search RPM charts here at Library and Archives Canada

 
Canada Singles
2000